Donington is the name of a number of places in England:

 Donington, Lincolnshire, a small town in South Holland, Lincolnshire
 Donington, Shropshire, a civil parish in Shropshire, England
 Donington on Bain, a village in Lindsey, Lincolnshire
 Donington le Heath, Leicestershire, England
 location of Donington le Heath Manor House Museum
 Castle Donington, a town in the north of Leicestershire
 Donington Hall, a mansion house set in parkland near Castle Donington
 Donington Park, a motor racing track and music festival venue near Castle Donington
 Donington Park motorway services, a motorway services station near Castle Donington

See also
Mary Donington, British sculptor
Robert Donington, British musicologist and early-music instrumentalist
Donnington (disambiguation)